Nobu Kōda 幸田延 (1870–1946) was a Japanese composer, violinist, and music teacher. She was one of the first Japanese women to study music overseas. She studied at the New England Conservatory. She later studied in Europe. She was the sister of Kōda Rohan.

Early life 
Nobu Kōda was born on April 19, 1870. Both her and her sister Andō Kōko studied at the Tokyo Music School. As a child she studied the koto and studied western music with Nakamura Sen. She graduated from the Institute in 1885 as part of the first graduating class.

Study Abroad 
Kōda's studies abroad allowed her to become an authority on western music up on her return to Japan.

She went to Boston and studied at the New England Conservatory in 1889 at the age of 19. She then returned to Japan for a short time before going to Europe. She studied in Vienna through 1895 before returning once again to Japan.

In 1892 she went to Germany and studied there with Joseph Joachim.

Nobu Kōda would leave for Europe again in 1909, though would once again return to Japan, where she lived until her death in 1946.

Impact and Works of Note 
Nobu Koda was considered an authority on western music in Japan, and was the first Japanese composer to write a violin sonata.

She taught at the Tokyo Music School, gave piano lessons to upper class girls, and became the teacher of the royal family. Both Nobu Koda and her sister taught Shinichi Suzuki, who became famous for his method of music teaching.

References 

1870 births
1946 deaths
19th-century classical composers
19th-century classical pianists
19th-century classical violinists
19th-century Japanese composers
19th-century Japanese educators
19th-century Japanese women
19th-century women composers
19th-century women educators
19th-century women pianists
20th-century classical composers
20th-century classical pianists
20th-century classical violinists
20th-century Japanese composers
20th-century Japanese educators
20th-century Japanese women musicians
20th-century women composers
20th-century women educators
20th-century women pianists
Boston Conservatory at Berklee alumni
Japanese classical composers
Japanese classical pianists
Japanese classical violinists
Japanese music educators
Japanese Romantic composers
Japanese women classical composers
Japanese women educators
Japanese women pianists
Japanese women violinists
Musicians from Tokyo
Women classical pianists
Women classical violinists
Women music educators